The Student Union of the University of Helsinki (HYY, HUS) was founded in 1868. It currently has 32,000 members and is one of the world's richest student organizations, with assets of several hundred million euros. Among other things, it owns a good deal of property in the city centre of Helsinki.

The union has been at the centre of student politics from the 19th-century nationalist movements, through the actions of the New Left in the 1960s, up to the present. Its governing assembly consists of parties which are connected to faculty organisations, the Student Nations, and the mainstream political parties. In May 2019, HYY's finance board (talousjohtokunta) removed Hapsu ry, the university branch of the Finns Party’s youth organization Finns Party Youth, from its register because Hapsu ry had expressed the opinion that "European nations are white, so it is only natural and healthy that whiteness is dominant in European scientific communities".

See also
 Old Student House, Helsinki
 New Student House, Helsinki

References

External links

Official website
History
Economical information and HYY Group financial information

University of Helsinki